Felipe Jorge Rodríguez Valla (born May 26, 1990) is an Uruguayan professional footballer.

External links
http://www.ligabancomer.mx/cancha

Living people
1990 births
Uruguayan footballers
Uruguayan Primera División players
Uruguayan Segunda División players
Liga MX players
Ecuadorian Serie A players
Argentine Primera División players
Israeli Premier League players
C.A. Cerro players
El Tanque Sisley players
Boston River players
Defensor Sporting players
Chiapas F.C. footballers
L.D.U. Quito footballers
Godoy Cruz Antonio Tomba footballers
Hapoel Tel Aviv F.C. players
Aldosivi footballers
Carlos A. Mannucci players
Uruguayan expatriate footballers
Expatriate footballers in Bolivia
Expatriate footballers in Mexico
Expatriate footballers in Ecuador
Expatriate footballers in Argentina
Expatriate footballers in Israel
Expatriate footballers in Peru
Uruguayan expatriate sportspeople in Bolivia
Uruguayan expatriate sportspeople in Mexico
Uruguayan expatriate sportspeople in Ecuador
Uruguayan expatriate sportspeople in Argentina
Uruguayan expatriate sportspeople in Israel
Uruguayan expatriate sportspeople in Peru
People from Canelones Department
Association football midfielders